Sergio Lozano Aguilar (born 9 January 1952) is a Mexican former professional boxer who competed from 1974 to 1980. As an amateur, he competed in the men's welterweight event at the 1972 Summer Olympics.

References

External links
 
 

1952 births
Living people
Mexican male boxers
Olympic boxers of Mexico
Boxers at the 1972 Summer Olympics
Boxers at the 1971 Pan American Games
Pan American Games medalists in boxing
Pan American Games bronze medalists for Mexico
Place of birth missing (living people)
Welterweight boxers
Medalists at the 1971 Pan American Games
Competitors at the 1974 Central American and Caribbean Games
Central American and Caribbean Games medalists in boxing
Central American and Caribbean Games bronze medalists for Mexico
20th-century Mexican people
21st-century Mexican people